Events from the year 1912 in Russia.

Incumbents
 Monarch – Nicholas II
 Chairman of the Council of Ministers – Vladimir Nikolayevich Kokovtsov

Events

 Russian Empire at the 1912 Summer Olympics
 Brusilov Expedition
 Lena massacre
 1912 Russian legislative election
 Moscow Art Theatre production of Hamlet

Births

Leonid Vitaliyevich Kantorovich: a Soviet mathematician and economist, known for his theory and development of techniques for the optimal allocation of resources.

Deaths

References

1912 in Russia
Years of the 20th century in the Russian Empire